Sanjay Silakari is currently a professor of Computer Science Engineeting, in a public institution located in Bhopal, India. The institution was established by the government of Madhya Pradesh with the name Rajiv Gandhi Technological University in 1958. .

Career
He is a professor of CSE in University Institute of Technology of RGPV. Dr. Silakari has more than two decades of teaching and administrative experience and has guided several students for their doctoral and master studies. He has several research publications to his credit in different reputed national and internal conferences and journals. His areas of interest include Network Security, Web Engineering, Web Personalization and Search Engines, Operating Systems, Computer Networks and E-Commerce. He is a life member of ISTE, CSI, IAENG and a member of IEEE and ACM. He is the author of book Basic Computer Engineering.

See also
Rajiv Gandhi Proudyogiki Vishwavidyalaya
University Institute of Technology RGPV

References

Living people
Indian academic administrators
Year of birth missing (living people)